Kaneez is a 1965 Pakistani Urdu black-and-white film directed by Hassan Tariq and produced by Hassan Tariq and Ali Sufiyan Afaqi. Its cast had Waheed Murad, Zeba, Mohammad Ali, Sabiha Khanum, Lehri, Saqi, Adeeb and Talish. The film revolves around a family having high traditions.

A golden jubilee hit film of the year, it won 5 Nigar Awards at the annual ceremony.

Cast
 Zeba
 Waheed Murad
 Mohammad Ali
 Sabiha Khanum
 Talish
 Lehri
 Adeeb
 Emi Minwala
 Gotam
 Imdad Hussain
 Saqi
 Khatana
 Pappu
 Billu
 (Guest appearances: Santosh Kumar, Aslam Parvez, Sabira Sultana, Nasira, Nabeela, Faizi, A. Shah, S. Suleman, Ahmad Rushdi)

Release
Kaneez was released on 26 November 1965 in Pakistani cinemas. The film completed 16 weeks on Naz Cinema and 50 weeks on other cinemas of Karachi and, thus, became a Golden Jubilee film.

Music
The music of the film was composed by Khalil Ahmed and Tasadduq Hussain and the songs were written by Himayat Ali Shair and Agha Hashar Kashmiri. Playback singers were Ahmed Rushdi, Mala, Naseem Begum and Masood Rana. A list of the songs of the film is as follows:

Jab raat dhali... by Ahmed Rushdi and Mala
Ghair ki baton ka akhir aitbaar aahee gaya Sung by Naseem Begum, Written by Agha Hashar Kashmiri. This ghazal song became a super-hit!
Pyar mein hum aye jaan-e-tamanna... by Ahmed Rushdi
Aag hai dono tarf barabar lagi hui... by Ahmed Rushdi
Tujhe haqeer samjhati rahe gi yeh duniya... by Masood Rana

Awards
Kaneez won 5 Nigar Awards in the following categories:

References

External links
Kaneez (1965 film) on Complete Index To World Film (CITWF) website - Archived
 

1960s Urdu-language films
Pakistani black-and-white films
Pakistani drama films
Urdu-language Pakistani films
1965 films
Nigar Award winners